Tippin' Point is an extended play by Canadian rock and country artist Dallas Smith. It was released in the United States on March 4, 2014 via Big Loud Mountain Records/Republic Nashville under the production of Joey Moi.

Tippin' Point was also released in Canada via 604 Records/Universal Music Canada. The American version features "Nothing but Summer." in place of a live acoustic version of "Jumped Right In"

Critical reception
Matt Bjorke of Roughstock gave the EP three and a half stars out of five, writing that "these songs are a strong presentation of Dallas Smith as a solo artist ready to break out as the next Country music star." Bjorke said that Smith has "an interesting and unique sound that is different than anyone in Country music and there’s more range in his voice than people may have expected" and felt that "there’s really not a song on the Tippin Point EP that couldn’t work on radio."

Track listing

Chart performance

Album
Tippin' Point sold 2,000 copies in the United States in its first week of release.

Singles

References

2014 debut EPs
Dallas Smith EPs
604 Records albums
Republic Records EPs
Albums produced by Joey Moi